Lukáš Chalupa (born December 28, 1993) is a Czech professional ice hockey player. He is currently playing for SK Horácká Slavia Třebíč of the Chance Liga.

Chalupa has previously played in the Czech Extraliga for HC Slavia Praha, HC Plzeň and Piráti Chomutov.

References

External links

1993 births
Living people
HC Berounští Medvědi players
Czech ice hockey defencemen
Stoczniowiec Gdańsk players
HC Kobra Praha players
Piráti Chomutov players
HC Plzeň players
Rytíři Kladno players
HC Slavia Praha players
SK Horácká Slavia Třebíč players
HC Slovan Ústečtí Lvi players
Sportovní Klub Kadaň players
HC Stadion Litoměřice players
People from Chomutov District
Sportspeople from the Ústí nad Labem Region
Czech expatriate ice hockey players in Slovakia
Czech expatriate ice hockey players in Sweden
Czech expatriate sportspeople in Poland
Expatriate ice hockey players in Poland